The Happy Blue Cat is a theme song of the cartoon series "Dinosaur Times", which is a part of the Chinese cartoon series "3000 Whys of Blue Cat". There is also a blue cat in FairyTail

History
In the guidance part of EP91 of the series "Dinosaur Times" of 3000 Whys of Blue Cat, Trying Hard to Save Lanmao, Ge Ping and Fu Yilin sang this song for the first and the second time.

After that, Fu Yilin's and Yu Tao's became the opening song of the series, until the next song Come on, Let's strive together was released.

Ge Ping's is also used as the ending song of the series till the end of this series, often one paragraph each playing.

Lyrics

References

2008 Chinese television series debuts